My Life/But You Know I Love You is a studio album by American country singer-songwriter Bill Anderson. It was released in June 1969 on Decca Records and was produced by Owen Bradley. It was Anderson's eleventh studio album to be issued during his musical career. The album's title was derived from its two singles of the same names. Both singles became major hits on the Billboard country chart.

Background and content
My Life/But You Know I Love You was recorded between 1968 and 1969 at Bradley's Barn, a studio owned by producer Owen Bradley that was located in Mount Juliet, Tennessee. It was to be Anderson's eleventh studio recording and eleventh to be produced with Bradley. The LP consisted of 11 tracks. Unlike Anderson's previous album, My Life only included two songs written by Anderson himself. The remainder of the material was written by others. Many of these compositions were cover versions of songs recorded by other performers. Among these tracks was one of the title tracks, "But You Know I Love You". The song was originally recorded and made a hit single by Kenny Rogers and the First Edition. "A Picture from Life's Other Side" had been originally cut by Hank Williams. Another track, "I Am," was written by Carter Howard, who was the son of Anderson's duet partner Jan Howard. In 1970, Howard would issue her own version of her son's track on the album For God and Country.

Release and reception
My Life/But You Know I Love You was released on Decca Records in June 1969. The album was issued as a vinyl LP, with six songs on side one and five songs on side two. The album spent a total of 23 weeks on the Billboard Top Country Albums chart before peaking at number four in September 1969. It became one of Anderson's highest-charting albums. My Life included 2 singles that were derived from the title of the album. The first single issued was "My Life (Throw It Away If I Want To)" in February 1969. The song became Anderson's fourth number one single on the Billboard Hot Country Singles chart that year. The song also reached number two on the RPM Country Singles chart in Canada. The second single issued was "But You Know I Love You" in November 1969. The song reached number two on the Billboard country songs chart following its release. In addition, the single would reach number 6 on the RPM Country Singles list. In later years, My Life/But You Know I Love You was reviewed by Allmusic and received a rating of three out of five possible stars.

Track listing

Personnel
All credits are adapted from the liner notes of My Life/But You Know I Love You.

Musical personnel
 Bill Anderson – lead vocals
 Harold Bradley – guitar
 Ray Edenton – guitar
 Buddy Harman – drums
 Roy Huskey – bass
 The Jordanaires – background vocals
 Jimmy Lance – guitar
 Grady Martin – guitar
 Charlie McCoy – harmonica, trumpet, vibes
 Hal Rugg – steel guitar
 Jerry Smith – piano, organ

Technical personnel
 Owen Bradley – record producer

Chart performance

Release history

References

1969 albums
Albums produced by Owen Bradley
Bill Anderson (singer) albums
Decca Records albums